2 Belgen was a Belgian new wave band, best known for their hits Opération Coup de Poing (1984), Queen of Mine (1985) and especially Lena (1985).

History

The band was founded in 1982 in Ghent by singer-guitarist Rembert De Smet (who later also focused on synthesizer) and drummer Herman Celis. Their band name literally translates to 2 Belgians, which "was the only thing we had in common", as they explained. The duo recorded their first single Quand Le Film Est Triste with Lena as a B-side. Their debut album 2 Belgen was released the same year. When Lena became a hit, the group re-recorded it in different arrangements and languages. The 1985 version charted the highest. Their 1984 cover of Alpha Blondy's Brigadier Sabari as Opération Coup de Poing also became a hit, as well as Queen of Mine. Thanks to their success, 2 Belgen expanded with additional members, making them no longer a musical duo. Celis left to join Nacht und Nebel and was replaced with Uli Kraemer, who previously played with Tank of Dankzig. Other new members were Alan Gevaert (bass), Jean-Lou Nowé (guitar) and Koen Brando (keyboards), making them no longer a musical duo.

In 1993 2 Belgen split up. Rembert De Smet died in 2017, while Herman Celis passed away in 2021.

Sources

External links
 Belgisch Pop & Rock Archief page.
 Muziekarchief page.

Belgian rock music groups
Belgian pop rock music groups
Musical groups established in 1982
Musical groups disestablished in 1993

de:2 Belgen
fr:2 Belgen
it:2 Belgen
nl:2 Belgen